Taylor Manson (born September 29, 1999) is an American athlete who competes primarily in the 400m.

From East Lansing, Michigan, she studied at East Lansing High School and at the University of Florida.  She was a 2018 IAAF World U20 Championships gold medalist in the 4x400m and bronze medalist in the individual 400m.

At the 2020 U.S. Olympic Trials held in Eugene, Oregon, Manson reached the final of the 400m and qualified for relay pool of the 4x400m relay at the 2020 Summer Games. At the Olympics she took part in the mixed 4 × 400 metres relay.

References

External links
 
 
 
 
 
 

1999 births
Living people
American female sprinters
People from East Lansing, Michigan
Florida Gators women's track and field athletes
Olympic bronze medalists for the United States in track and field
Athletes (track and field) at the 2020 Summer Olympics
Medalists at the 2020 Summer Olympics